The 1996 Texas Terror season was the first season for the Texas Terror. They finished the 1996 Arena Football League season 1–13 and were one of four teams in the National Conference to miss the playoffs.

Regular season

Schedule

Standings

References

Houston Thunderbears seasons
1996 Arena Football League season
Texas Terror Season, 1996